Soe Tjen Marching (born April 23, 1971 in Surabaya, Indonesia) is a writer, academician, activist, and a composer of avant-garde music from Indonesia. In 1998, she won national competition for Indonesian Contemporary Composers held by the German Embassy. Her compositions have been played in New Zealand, Indonesia and Japan. Her work has been released on the CD Asia Piano Avantgarde - Indonesia, played by pianist Steffen Schleiermacher. In 2010, her work has been selected as one of the two best compositions in the International Competition for avant-garde composers held in Singapore. In her musical career, she has been mainly an autodidact.

Besides being a composer, Marching is also a creative writer and a senior lecturer teaching Indonesian at SOAS in London. She completed her PhD at Monash University in Australia. Her book, The Discrepancy between the Public and the Private Selves of Indonesian Women was published by The Edwin Mellen Press (2007). She has also won several creative writing competitions in Australia and has been published in Australia, the United States and the United Kingdom. She is married to Angus Nicholls, a literary scholar at Queen Mary University,  London. Her novel, Mati Bertahun yang Lalu, was published by Gramedia (Jakarta - Indonesia) in November 2010. Her book about Indonesian women Kisah di Balik Pintu was published by Ombak in 2011 and her book about a woman suffering from cancer, Kubunuh di Sini, was published by Gramedia in 2013. In 2017, her book on the 1965 genocide in Indonesia entitled The End of Silence: Accounts of the 1965 Genocide in Indonesia, was published by Amsterdam University Press. 

In 2009, Soe Tjen founded a magazine in Indonesia called Majalah Bhinneka (Bhinneka Magazine), which promotes critical thinking about gender, politics and religions. Soe Tjen has written several essays on women, Indonesian politics, and religions in Indonesian, English and German.

References

External links
 https://archive.today/20121212124117/http://mcel.pacificu.edu/easpac/bio.php3
 https://web.archive.org/web/20070203232207/http://mcel.pacificu.edu/easpac/
 http://unjobs.org/authors/soe-tjen-marching
 https://web.archive.org/web/20070720132131/http://www.geogr.uni-goettingen.de/kus/apsa/pn/pn27/pn27_marching.pdf
 https://web.archive.org/web/20110707000153/http://www.musikontakt.ch/neuheiten/MK_2005-09.pdf
 http://www.mellenpress.com/mellenpress.cfm?bookid=6994&pc=9
 http://intersections.anu.edu.au/issue10/marching.html
 http://www.pulp.net/fiction/biogs/marching-soe-tjen.html
 https://web.archive.org/web/20080719180319/http://www.colloquy.monash.edu.au/issue007/marching.html

Indonesian composers
Indonesian people of Chinese descent
People from Surabaya
Indonesian feminists
Indonesian journalists
Indonesian women journalists
Indonesian activists
Indonesian women activists
Indonesian women novelists
Indonesian novelists
Indonesian essayists
Living people
1971 births